Gammans is a surname. Notable people with the surname include:

David Gammans (1895–1957), British politician
Muriel Gammans (1898–1989), British politician, wife of David

See also
Gammans Baronets
Gamman
Gammons